The 1985 French Open was a tennis tournament that took place on the outdoor clay courts at the Stade Roland Garros in Paris, France. The tournament was held from 27 May until 9 June. It was the 89th staging of the French Open, and the first Grand Slam tennis event of 1985.

The event was part of the 1985 Nabisco Grand Prix and 1985 Virginia Slims World Championship Series.

Finals

Men's singles 

 Mats Wilander defeated  Ivan Lendl, 3–6, 6–4, 6–2, 6–2 
It was Wilander's 4th career Grand Slam title, and his 2nd French Open title.

Women's singles

 Chris Evert defeated  Martina Navratilova, 6–3, 6–7(4-7), 7–5 
It was Evert's 17th career Grand Slam title, and her 6th French Open title.

Men's doubles

 Mark Edmondson /  Kim Warwick defeated  Schlomo Glickstein /  Hans Simonsson, 6–3, 6–4, 6–7, 6–3

Women's doubles

 Martina Navratilova /  Pam Shriver defeated  Claudia Kohde-Kilsch /  Helena Suková, 4–6, 6–2, 6–2

Mixed doubles

 Martina Navratilova /  Heinz Günthardt defeated  Paula Smith /  Francisco González, 2–6, 6–3, 6–2

Prize money

Total prize money for the event was FF19,895,600.

References

External links
 French Open official website